Lägh da Cavloc (Italian: Lago di Cavloccio) is a lake near Maloja Pass in the Val Forno, Grisons, Switzerland.

While the northern shore is rocky and lined with pine trees, there is a beach on the shallow southern shore that is a popular swimming spot despite the cold water temperature.

There is a mountain restaurant at the lake and the Alp da Cavloc is located south of the lake.

Access 
The lake can be reached on an easy hiking trail from Maloja in about an hour's hiking time. In winter, the trail is groomed as a winter hiking trail and cross-country ski trail.

Art and culture 
The lake was painted by Giovanni Giacometti in 1922.

See also
List of mountain lakes of Switzerland

References

Lakes of Switzerland
Lakes of Graubünden
Bregaglia